Modest Menzinsky (Модест  Менцинський, 29 April 1875 ― 11 December 1935) was a Ukrainian tenor.

Life 
He studied at University of Lviv. He studied voice with  Walery Wysocki and Julius Stockhausen. He debuted at Opernhaus Frankfurt in 1901. He sang in works by Richard Wagner and Franz Schreker.

References 

1875 births
1935 deaths
Ukrainian tenors